The 1919 Pontefract by-election was a parliamentary by-election held for the British House of Commons constituency of Pontefract  in Yorkshire on 6 September 1919.

Vacancy
The by-election was caused by the death on 30 July 1919 of the sitting Coalition Liberal Member of Parliament, Sir Joseph Compton-Rickett. He was 72 years old. He had been an MP in the area since 1906 when he was elected for Osgoldcross. He had been Lloyd George's Paymaster General since 1916.

Electoral history
The Pontefract constituency had been Liberal since 1893 and Osgoldcross Liberal since 1885. At the general election in 1918, Compton-Rickett was re-elected with the support of the Coalition Government 'coupon'.

Candidates
The by-election was a straight fight between Isaac Burns for the Labour Party, the nominee of the Yorkshire Miners' Association and 50-year-old Walter Forrest, a woollen manufacturer from Pudsey for the Coalition Government of Prime Minister David Lloyd George, although the Liberals apparently had some trouble in finding a candidate at first. The local Conservatives endorsed the candidacy of their Coalition partners  and the Independent Asquithian Liberals did not bring a forward a candidate.

Campaign

Labour
The health of the coal mining industry was an issue which Isaac Burns particularly sought to make his own against the background of a coal strike taking place in the area. He was hampered by the fact that although coal mining was a major industry in the area, the principal colliery towns had been attached to other constituencies in boundary changes  and mining was not necessarily decisive as there were many other interests in the constituency. Agriculture dominated around Barkston Ash and there was shipping and coastal trades around Goole.  Many in these industries were adversely affected by the coal strike and were unsympathetic to Burns and Labour as a result. Burns stated he was in favour of a number of Labour policies including equal adult franchise for both sexes, pensions for mothers and free secondary education for all. He was in favour of widespread nationalisation of industry and a programme of public works to keep down unemployment. He also wanted Home Rule for Ireland and local government for India.

Liberal
Walter Forrest set out his position on a number of questions at his meetings of both the local Coalition Liberals and Unionist parties.  He was opposed to the nationalisation of the coal mines and conscription, in favour of some relaxation of the liquor laws for the benefit of working men and improved welfare for men disabled in the war; he was also in favour of the full restoration of trade and commerce as soon as conditions allowed, to increase output and living standards. He also strongly advocated economy and retrenchment   but one of the Liberal MPs who visited the constituency to speak for him, Dr T J Macnamara the Secretary to the Admiralty, in a speech designed to protect the position of his Department and no doubt appeal to the patriotic feelings of working class and Unionist voters, was keen to point out that national security must take precedence over economy.

Result
Forrest retained the seat for the government but with a reduced majority.

See also
List of United Kingdom by-elections
United Kingdom by-election records

References

1919 elections in the United Kingdom
By-elections to the Parliament of the United Kingdom in West Yorkshire constituencies
1919 in England
Elections in Wakefield
Pontefract
1910s in Yorkshire